3 'N the Mornin' (Part One) is an album by Bigtyme Records that was mixed by DJ Screw. It was released in 1994 in cassette. Part Two Blue version was released in 1996.

Track listing

 "Hi Power (with intro)" – Dr. Dre featuring Daz Dillinger, Rage , RBX & (DJ Screw intro)
 "City Streets" – Spice 1
 "Don't Stop" – Too Short
 "Good Day" – Ice Cube
 "Big Dick" – Schooly D
 "Dre Day" – Dr. Dre featuring Jewell, RBX & Snoop Dogg
 "Agravated Rasta" – Street Military featuring Klondike Kat
 "White Horse" – Laid Back
 "Commercial (Let me ride)" – Dr. Dre 
 "Track 10 (unknown naming)"
 "Rock tha Bells" – LL Cool J
 "Nigga With A Gun" – Dr. Dre featuring Snoop Dogg
 "Compton Thang" – Compton's Most Wanted
 "Sugar Free" – Mtume
 "Dumb Girl" - Run DMC 
 "Dead In A Year" – Street Military
 "So Funky" – Yo-Yo
 "Track 18 (unknown naming)"
 "Everlasting Bass" - Joe Cooley

Notes 

1994 albums
DJ Screw albums